Tibi can refer to:
 Tibi, Alicante, a municipality in Spain
 Tibi (footballer) (1951–2021), Portuguese footballer
 Ahmad Tibi, Israeli Arab politician
 Bassam Tibi, professor of International Relations
 Eitan Tibi (born 1987), an Israeli footballer
 Tibi (fashion brand), an American fashion company

See also
 Tibicos, a symbiotic culture used for fermentation
 Ottavio Tiby, Italian ethnomusicologist